Kuvag is a rural locality (a selo) in Guriksky Selsoviet, Tabasaransky District, Republic of Dagestan, Russia. The population was 101 as of 2010.

Geography 
Kuvag is located 13 km southwest of Khuchni (the district's administrative centre) by road. Dagni is the nearest rural locality.

References 

Rural localities in Tabasaransky District